Radio Atardecer is a radio station located in Pichilemu.

External links 

 Radio Atardecer

Radio stations in Chile
Mass media in Pichilemu
Organizations based in Pichilemu
Organizations established in 1986
1986 establishments in Chile